Worth It All is the fourth studio album from the contemporary worship musician Meredith Andrews, released on January 22, 2013 via Word Records. "Not for a Moment (After All)" was released as the album's lead single on July 31, 2012. On February 9, 2013, the album peaked at number 144 on the Billboard 200 and number 7 on the Christian albums chart.

Background 
Meredith Andrews talked about the album with Caroline Lusk of CCM Magazine, and Andrews referenced: "When we first started the record about two years ago, the direction we were going wasn't quite what I had in mind. … We had four of five songs done and after listening, I just had to be honest and say that it wasn't really where my heart was. I felt like I was writing songs to fill space." In response, Andrews went to her record label, and told them she "was going to do a worship record" as expressed in her own words: "That's who I am" or "I don't even know what another direction looks like." This meant that "[she] wanted to write songs for the body of Christ to sing back to the Lord in corporate worship, but I felt kind of guilty because I hadn't asked Him for songs. … I could hear him saying, 'You have not because you ask not. Ask me for songs, 'cause I have a lot of them."

Andrews told that the song "The Gospel Changes Everything", is about "God's story. It's the beauty of the story of Jesus. … We were talking about the Gospel and how it can truly transform the lives of people. Nothing added, nothing taken away."

Response

Commercial 
For the week of February 9, 2013, the album was the seventh most popular Christian Album by Billboard magazine chart, and it was the 144th most popular in the United States via the Billboard 200.

Critical 

At CCM Magazine, Andy Argyrakis bestowed on the album a four-out-of-five-stars, and exclaimed: "With three years between studio CD's, the already talented Meredith Andrews has grown by even more noticeable leaps and bounds throughout Worth It All. In addition to honing her vertically-centered songwriting chops and expanding a glorious vocal range, the project is loaded with soul-stirring often times anthemic [sic] contemporary pop arrangements." Christian Music Zine's Joshua Andre conferred upon the album a 4.75-out-of-five-stars, and vowed that it is "Meredith's most mature and 'complete' album to date". At Cross Rhythms, Tony Cummings rated the album a perfect ten-squares, which he called it "her best so far", and stated that as a listener we may have become "a little bored with sound-the-same live worship projects then seek out this deftly crafted studio set of heartwarming new worship songs." Indie Vision Music's Jonathan Andre presented the album with a four-out-of-five-stars, and commended how "this is a great album ready to bless those who listen to these uplifting songs." Jesus Freak Hideout's Jen Rose imposed a rating of three-and-a-half-out-of-five-stars on the album by Andrews, and illustrated that "Worth It All sounds like a musician at home, in her element, leading others into God's presence."

Louder Than the Music's Jono Davies imparted a four-out-of-five-stars rating on the album, and vowed that "Worth It All is a great worship album, full of songs with great melodies. But what really stood out for me was the fact that Meredith knows how to use her voice to glorify God, and on this album she does this amazingly well." New Release Tuesday's Kevin Davis bequeathed the album a five-out-of-five-stars, and praised "Meredith Andrews' excellent songwriting, singing and captivating songs have made her my favorite female worship songwriter and singer. If you like Christy Nockels, Brooke Fraser Ligertwood and Natalie Grant, you must get Worth It All by Meredith Andrews." Furthermore, Davis complementing the album in doing so affirmed: "Truly, every song is amazing. It's hard to imagine, but Meredith has now once again released her "best" album topping her previous excellent work. This is the most spine-tingling female led worship project I've experienced and all of these songs are completely anointed, Spirit-led and emotionally captivating. There are no weak songs and this album is truly a masterpiece. Worth It All is flawless and overflows with worship-driven emotional responses to our Lord and Savior." Greg Wallace of Worship Leader deemed the album a four-out-of-five-stars by Andrews, and declared that "Each of the songs on Worth It All would be instantly at home on Christian radio...and the vast majority of them would serve well in congregational worship." AllMusic's Heather Phares commenting that the album "in general, reflecting a subtlety and immediacy that make Andrews' approach to praise & worship unique. This shouldn't be a surprise, given that she's been a songwriter since her high-school days, but nevertheless, it's refreshing." Lastly, Phares called it "sweetly uplifting sound".

Track listing

Charts

Album

References 

2013 albums
Meredith Andrews albums
Word Records albums